Vitreolina philippi is a species of sea snail, a marine gastropod mollusk in the family Eulimidae. The species is one of a number within the genus Vitreolina.

Distribution
This species occurs in the Mediterranean Sea, in the North Atlantic Ocean (in European waters) and off the Azores, Canary Islands and Cape Verde.

References

 Gofas, S.; Le Renard, J.; Bouchet, P. (2001). Mollusca, in: Costello, M.J. et al. (Ed.) (2001). European register of marine species: a check-list of the marine species in Europe and a bibliography of guides to their identification. Collection Patrimoines Naturels, 50: pp. 180–213

philippi
Molluscs of the Atlantic Ocean
Molluscs of the Mediterranean Sea
Molluscs of the Azores
Gastropods of Cape Verde
Gastropods described in 1854